Collirene  (also Sand Hill, Hays Hill, Hayes Hill) is an unincorporated community in Lowndes County, Alabama, United States.

Thomas Perkins Abernethy (1890–1975), writer, historian, and educator, was born in Collirene.

Notes

Unincorporated communities in Lowndes County, Alabama
Unincorporated communities in Alabama